Florian Bertmer is a German illustrator from the hardcore punk, grindcore and metal scene. He has done artwork for bands like Converge, Napalm Death, The Hope Conspiracy, The Dillinger Escape Plan, Agoraphobic Nosebleed, Pig Destroyer, Doomriders, Kirk Hammett, Lucasfilm, Alamo Drafthouse and others. His early works were reminiscent of Pushead while his later works have become more influenced by Art Nouveau and Occultism . He fronted the band Cheerleaders Of The Apocalypse. He has also created several official movie posters in collaboration with Alamo Drafthouse Cinema and has designed deck art for skateboard companies such as Creature Skateboards or Substance Abuse.

Artwork
Artwork for Converge includes illustrations for the inside cover for The Poacher Diaries and back cover artwork and insert poster for Deeper the Wound. Since their 1998 "Rise from Ruin" European tour he has done several t-shirt designs as well and a sought after poster for their 2007 tour.

Artwork for Agoraphobic Nosebleed includes front cover artwork for Bestial Machinery (Discography Volume 1), Split with Kill the Client 7", A Clockwork Sodom 7", Split CD/LP with Apartment 213, Agorapocalypse, and a 7" split with Total Fucking Destruction. In collaboration with Shirts & Destroy he has done several online exclusive shirt designs for Agoraphobic Nosebleed.

Bertmer also designed the cover art for Jesuit's 2011 compilation album Discography.

Album covers (selection) 
 Napalm Death
 Live in Japan - Grind Kaijyu Attack! split with Nasum LP (2009)

Agoraphobic Nosebleed
 Agorapocalypse (2009)
 Bestial Machinery (Discography Volume 1) 2xCD (2005)
 The Poacher Diaries split with Converge CD/LP (1999)
 Split with Kill The Client 7" (2007)
 A Clockwork Sodom 7" (2007)
 Domestic Powerviolence split with Apartment 213 CD/LP (2007)
 Split with Total Fucking Destruction 7" (2007)
 Split with Insect Warfare 5"/mini-CD (2008)

Converge
 The Poacher Diaries split with Converge CD/LP (1999)
 Deeper the Wound Split with Hellchild CD/LP (2001)

Jesuit
 Discography (2011)

Rise and Fall
 Clawing 7" (2007)

All Pigs Must Die
 All Pigs Must Die EP( 2010)
 God Is War CD/LP (2011)

16
 Bridges to Burn CD/LP (2009)

Outbreak
 Failure CD/LP (2006)

Movie artwork
He has worked on numerous limited edition movie posters for Alamo Drafthouse for such iconic films as The Holy Mountain, Hellboy, the Evil Dead, Night of the Living Dead, Santa Sangre, the Swamp Thing, Hellraiser and Cowboys and Aliens''.

References

External links
 The Art of Florian Bertmer

Album-cover and concert-poster artists
German illustrators
Living people
Year of birth missing (living people)